Meriwether (also Meriweather, Meriwether Station) is an unincorporated community in Baldwin County, Georgia, United States.

It is the location of Westbrook-Hubert Farm, which is listed on the U.S. National Register of Historic Places.

References

Unincorporated communities in Baldwin County, Georgia
Unincorporated communities in Georgia (U.S. state)